Ushuaïa TV is a French television channel, owned by Groupe TF1. The network carries programming about nature.

History 
Ushuaïa TV was launched on 14 March 2005 by Groupe TF1, inspired by the TF1 popular show Ushuaïa Nature.

Ushuaïa TV and TF1 other pay-TV channels were initially available exclusively on Canalsat and cable providers, until 2 January 2012 when they joined ISP optional packages. Ushuaïa TV arrived on Freebox TV on 1 January 2015, replacing Stylia.

In December 2012, Discovery Communications acquired 20% of TF1 pay-TV thematic channels for €170 million for Eurosport and €14 million for Ushuaïa TV, Histoire, Stylia and TV Breizh.

On 17 July 2015, TF1 sold its remaining 49% stake in Eurosport to Discovery Communications for €492 million. At the same time, the French group bought out the 20% stake held by the American group in its pay-TV channels (TV Breizh, Histoire and Ushuaïa) for 14.6 million euros.

On 5 December 2019, TV Breizh, Ushuaïa TV and Histoire were rebranded with a "TV" logo common between them.

Programming 
Ushuaïa TV concentrates on nature, but also airs reruns of old TF1 programmes such as Ushuaïa Nature.

References

Television networks in France
Television channels and stations established in 2005
2005 establishments in France
Television stations in France